Llandrindod Wells (/ɬanˈdɾindɔd/  "Trinity Parish"), sometimes known colloquially as Llandod, is a town and community in Powys, within the historic boundaries of Radnorshire, Wales. It serves as the seat of Powys County Council and thus the administrative centre of Powys.

It was developed as a spa town in the 19th century, with a boom in the late 20th century as a centre of local government.  Before the 1860s the site of the town was common land in Llanfihangel Cefnllys parish. Llandrindod Wells is the fifth largest town in Powys and the largest in Radnorshire.

History

During the mid-18th century, the 'healing qualities' of the local spring waters attracted visitors to the area resulting in an economic boom with the building of a 'splendid' hotel at Llandrindod Hall. A period of relative decline during the late 18th and early 19th centuries was reversed with the construction of the Heart of Wales line making Llandrindod accessible from south Wales, the Midlands and northwest England. Enclosure of the common in 1862 enabled the expansion of the town with the construction of new streets, hotels, shops and houses.

During the 'season' between May and mid-September, visitors would take the waters at the pump rooms at the Rock Park and Pump House Hotel, entertained by orchestras. Hotels, boarding houses and shops—including the Central Wales Emporium on the corner of Temple Street and Station Crescent—provided for the visitors. In the early 1870s, an ornamental lake was formed by draining marshland near the Pump House Hotel (on the current site of the Council offices), and in 1893 a 9-hole golf course was opened on the common beside the lake (later replaced by the present 18-hole course on the hills above). Horse races (and later air displays) were held on the Rock Ddole meadow beside the river.

In 1893, Archdeacon Henry de Winton, who had responsibility for the area at the time, had Llandrindod old church and Cefnllys church unroofed in order to persuade the congregations to attend the new church in the centre of the town. Both churches were later restored in 1895 following protest. 

Llandrindod was the place of the election of the first Archbishop of Wales in 1920, which occurred at the Old Parish Church. Elections for every Archbishop since have continued to be held in Llandrindod, now at Holy Trinity Church in the Town Centre. In 1907, a Catholic church was founded in the town, Our Lady of Ransom and the Holy Souls Church.

The town has maintained an important profile in the world of motoring and motorsport. Apart from two of its most symbolic recent buildings being the Tom Norton's Automobile Palace and Pritchard's Garage, it served as the base for many International motorcycle events such as the International Six Days Trial ISDT starting in 1933 with the last visit taking place in 1961, often drawing in crowds of thousands to watch.

The town's boom continued until the First World War during which time soldiers on training courses were billeted in hotels and boarding houses, and refugees and wounded soldiers were accommodated in the town. The depression of the late-1920s and 1930s led to many hotels and boarding houses being turned into private homes and flats. During the Second World War the town was again used for military hospitals and billets, followed by a slump in the post-war years. The Beeching Axe resulted in the closure in the mid-1960s of the Mid-Wales line and with it Llandrindod's connection from nearby Builth Wells direct to Cardiff and to north and west Wales. The town does retain connections to Swansea and Shrewsbury from Llandrindod railway station on the Heart of Wales line.

Prior to 1974, the town housed much of the administration of Radnorshire, although the official county town was Presteigne. The reorganisation of local government in 1974 resulted in Llandrindod becoming the county town of the newly formed administrative county of Powys. This led to an influx of people employed by the new bureaucracies, on salaries determined by national pay scales. The new County Hall was based on Spa Road East in Llandrindod Wells.

In a 2017 survey undertaken by Rightmove, Llandrindod was voted the Happiest Place in Wales. A survey by the Royal Mail over the Easter 2018 period showed that Llandrindod had the highest online shopping rates for that period in the whole of the country.

Climate

Governance
Three county electoral wards lie within the boundaries of the town which each elect a councillor to Powys County Council: Llandrindod East/West, Llandrindod North and Llandrindod South. Llandrindod Wells Town Council has up to 15 town councillors (elected from five community wards) and one clerk. In March 2019, the Mayor and Chair of three years, Cllr Jon Williams, resigned amid bullying claims.

Notable landmarks

The architecture of the town includes many buildings in ornate styles dating from the boom period of the Victorian and Edwardian eras including the Metropole, the Glen Usk and the Gwalia hotels, The Albert Hall, and Llandrindod railway station which built in 1865. The Old Town Hall, which was originally commissioned as a doctor's home and surgery, was completed in 1872.

There are also buildings in the Art Deco style including two former garages, Pritchard's and the Automobile Palace. The latter was notable for a collection of antique bicycles owned by the proprietor, Tom Norton, which were displayed suspended from ceilings in the building. The building has in recent years been renovated and is now home to several small businesses and the National Cycle Collection, featuring some of the bicycles originally displayed in the garage.

The largest of the town's hotels are the Metropole (with 120 bedrooms of 4 star standard, an indoor swimming pool and leisure centre), the Glen Usk and the Commodore. The Hotel Metropole's swimming pool used to be open-air and was open to the public but is now reserved for guests.

A large man-made lake in the town is used for fishing and model boating. The lake houses a sculpture of a water serpent and leaping carp, the scales of which are made of thousands of copper plates initialed by local people and visitors during construction of the work. Beside the lake, sits a distinctive tree-trunk sculpture known as a 'Llandoddie', one of many such sculptures distributed throughout the town. In May 2018, pedalo boats for hire were launched onto Llandrindod Lake, as part of a £158,000 regeneration project. Llandrindod Wells' parks are listed, as a collective, on the Cadw/ICOMOS Register of Parks and Gardens of Special Historic Interest in Wales. The Grade II* listing reflects the parks' significant role in the "development of Llandrindod Wells as a flourishing spa town".

An 18-hole golf course, which features challenging topology and views over the lake, was established in 1905.

The town has three international standard outdoor bowling greens dating from 1912 which hosts national and international events and has recently been voted ‘the best facilities in the whole of the British Isles’. A newer indoor bowling centre, can also be found in the centre of the town.

Llandrindod Wells County War Memorial Hospital was opened in 1881.

Culture

Llandrindod Wells Victorian Festival is held in the town every year at the end of August. Many locals and some visitors dress in Victorian, Edwardian or other antique costumes, and many of the town's shops and other high-street businesses dress their windows or otherwise join in the spirit of the event. The festival typically offers open-air and street theatre and music, a fairground, a craft fair, an historical re-enactment, entertainments at The Albert Hall and exhibitions of "things old-time".

There is a wide range of entertainment available in the town each year. The Albert Hall is the town's Victorian Theatre, owned and run by the community of Llandrindod. The Theatre is managed by a group of volunteers from the local area. The theatre hosts a wide range of performances and activities suitable for all. 
Many local organisation's events are held at the Theatre. 

Pavilion Mid Wales (formerly known as The Grand Pavilion) brings a wide range of entertainment to the town.

The town hosts annual Welsh 2 Day Enduro in June. The enduro started in 1952, and is the UK's biggest time card motorcycle enduro event. The event covers 300 miles, over 2 days, with 500 competitors. 

A typical year of events within the town looks like this:

Education
Llandrindod has two primary schools and one secondary school:

Llandrindod Wells CP School - Cefnllys (Ysgol Cefnllys) is an English Medium Local Authority Primary school. Llandrindod Wells Church in Wales School - Ysgol Trefonnen is an English and Welsh Medium Local Authority Primary School.

Ysgol Calon Cymru is the town's Local Authority secondary school. The school has two campuses, which replaced the former Llandrindod High School (and Builth Wells High School) and opened in September 2018. The Llandrindod site provides an English-medium education for 11 to 18 year olds.

Notable people 

 Curigwen Lewis (1905–1992) an actress of stage and screen.
 Betty Morgan MBE (born 1942), an international lawn and indoor bowler. 
 Percy Jones (born 1947), a bass guitarist, a member of the jazz fusion ensemble Brand X
 Mark Layton (born 1957), a darts player with the World Darts Federation, lives in the town.
 Kirsty Wade (born 1962), former middle-distance runner, three-time Commonwealth Games gold medallist
 Carl Robinson (born 1976), a retired footballer with 406 club caps and 42 for Wales
 Dan Lydiate (born 1987), a Wales rugby union player with 84 caps for Wales

Twinning
Llandrindod Wells is twinned with:
 Bad Rappenau in Germany
 Contrexéville in France

Llandrindod Wells Twinning Association host annual trips to and from the Twinned towns.

References

Bibliography 
 Jane Griffiths, Walking Around Llandrindod Wells: Historic Spa Town, Kittiwake Press, 2007, 
 Olivia Harries, Llandrindod Wells in Old Postcards, C Davies, 1986, 
 Reginald Campbell Burn Oliver, Bridging a century: [the Hotel Metropole, Llandrindod Wells, 1872-1972], a century of growth in the story of Llandrindod Wells, Radnorshire, Sayce Brothers Printers, 1972, 
 Reginald Campbell Burn Oliver, The centenary of the Church of the Holy Trinity, Llandrindod Wells, 1871-1971, R.C.B. Oliver, 1971, 
 Bruce Osborne, Llandrindod Wells, New Millennium Spa Heritage Series, 1999, 
 Joel Williams, Voices of Llandrindod Wells, Red Dragon, 2000, 
 Chris Wilson, Around Llandrindod Wells, The Chalford Publishing Company, 1995,

External links 

 Llandrindod Website 
 Llandrindod Wells Twinning Website of Llandrindod Wells and Area Twinning Association
 Llandrindod Wells Town Council Llandrindod Wells Town Council.

 
Spa towns in Wales
Towns in Powys
County towns in Wales
Registered historic parks and gardens in Powys